The 2019 Central Pulse season saw the Central Pulse netball team compete in the 2019 ANZ Premiership. With a team coached by Yvette McCausland-Durie, captained by Katrina Rore and featuring Karin Burger, Aliyah Dunn, Ameliaranne Ekenasio and Sulu Fitzpatrick, Pulse finished the regular season as minor premiers. In the grand final, Pulse defeated Northern Stars 52–48, winning their first premiership.

Players

Player movements

2019 roster

Pre-season
In early February, Pulse traveled to Brisbane and played a series of matches against Queensland Fusion and the Queensland under-19 team. Pulse also hosted the official ANZ Premiership pre-season tournament at Te Wānanga o Raukawa in Otaki on February 8–10.

Regular season

Fixtures and results
Round 1

Round 2

Round 3

Round 4

Round 5

Round 6

Round 7

Round 8

Round 9

Round 10

Round 11

Round 12

Round 13

Final standings

Finals Series

Grand final

National Netball League
With a team featuring Api Taufa, Ainsleyana Puleiata and Saviour Tui, Pulse's reserve team, now renamed Central Manawa, won the 2019 National Netball League title after defeating Waikato Bay of Plenty 49–46 in the grand final.

Award winners

New Zealand Netball Awards

Team of the season
Four Pulse players were included in Stuff's team of the season, selected by Brendon Egan.

References

2019
2019 ANZ Premiership season
2019 in New Zealand netball